Hugh Gerard Sweetman (20 June 1908 – 28 January 1970) was an Irish Fine Gael politician who served as Minister for Finance from 1954 to 1957. He served as a Teachta Dála (TD) for the Kildare constituency from 1948 to 1970. He was a Senator for the Labour Panel from 1943 to 1948.

Family and childhood
Hugh Gerard Sweetman was born on 20 June 1908. His father, James Sweetman, was a practising barrister, and the family's return for the 1911 census shows that they employed three servants at their Lower Baggot Street home. His mother Agnes was the daughter of Sir George Fottrell of North Great George's Street, Dublin. His brothers, Séamus, George, and Denis, served in the World War II; Denis was killed 23 May 1940 at Boulogne and Séamus was awarded an MBE in 1945.

James' brother, Roger Sweetman, was elected to the First Dáil representing Wexford North and was one of the first TDs to publicly call for a negotiated settlement to the Irish War of Independence.

Gerard was educated at the Downside School in England. He completed his studies at Trinity College Dublin and went on to qualify as a solicitor in 1930.

Early political career
Sweetman's first brush with politics came with his involvement with the Blueshirts: He was a member of the League of Youth, one of their youth wings, and was elected to Blueshirt's national council in August 1935. As the Blueshirts dissipated, Sweetman folded into the newly formed Fine Gael. Three weeks after his 29th birthday, Gerard Sweetman contested the 1937 general election. His target was the four-seater Carlow–Kildare constituency. Out of a field of 7 candidates, Sweetman came in sixth with 8.5% of the vote.

He did not contest the 1938 general election but ran again in 1943, and once again failed to secure election. He secured a Seanad seat in weeks that followed, and remained in the upper house through the 1944 election, until finally, with the creation of a separate Kildare constituency, he won a Dáil seat at the 1948 general election.

The 1948 general election returned the first inter-party government under Taoiseach John A. Costello. This coalition represented an 'anybody-but-Fianna-Fáil' gathering from across the political spectrum, and the newest Kildare TD sat on the backbenches until the government fell in 1951.

A second inter-party government took office in June 1954 with Sweetman promoted to Minister for Finance.

In Professor Tom Garvin's review of the 1950s 'News from a New Republic', he comes in for praise as a moderniser and Garvin places him with a cross-party group including Daniel Morrissey of Fine Gael and William Norton of the Labour Party as well as Seán Lemass of Fianna Fáil who were pushing a modernising agenda

Sweetman also served as a member of Kildare County Council, including a term as chairman of the Council in the late 1940s.

Ministerial career
He was now 45 years old, and he inherited a national economy that was in crisis. Unemployment was at 421,000; over 100,000 people had left agriculture during the previous 8 years; the country was seeing a level of emigration unknown since the famine.

Sweetman differed in his thinking from the protectionist policies espoused by Éamon de Valera since the 1930s. Rather than focussing on a self-sufficient Ireland, Sweetman enacted policies that would make Ireland a net exporter.

In his first budget in 1955, he introduced a scheme whereby a tax exemption was provided for exported goods. He also established the Prize Bonds programme as a means of reducing the national debt. This debt was worrying in the mid-1950s. Two major bond issues were placed during Sweetman's tenure, for £20 million and £12 million. These were large sums at a time when an average worker entered the tax net with an annual salary of just £533.

However, Sweetman's greatest initiative as minister was the appointment of a young man of talent and vision. On 30 May 1956, he elevated a 39-year-old civil servant named Ken Whitaker to the position of Secretary-General of the Department of Finance. This was a revolutionary step, as it did not follow the convention of promotion based on time served. Whitaker's time at the department has been seen as instrumental in the economic development of the country, and a 2001 RTÉ contest named him 'Irishman of the 20th Century'. Whitaker continued in office under the Fianna Fáil government elected in 1957, and his seminal "First Programme for Economic Expansion" published in 1958 laid the foundations for economic growth in the 1960s.

Later career
For Sweetman, this brief period of government was not to be repeated and he would remain in opposition for the rest of his life.

During the 1960s, Fine Gael itself witnessed a major transformation. The decade began with a new leader, James Dillon, and a renewed focus on making the party relevant.

This internal revolution culminated in the 'Just Society' document produced by Declan Costello. The distinctly social democrat flavour of the document was very much at odds with Sweetman's deeply conservative views. However, the support of Liam Cosgrave and Garret FitzGerald ensured that the document was adopted as the party's manifesto for the 1965 general election.

In his last election, in June 1969, Sweetman was again returned to the Dáil for a seventh successive term. The election left only a handful of seats between Fianna Fáil and the opposition.

Death
He was known for his high-speed style of driving. on 28 January 1970 while returning from a business meeting on the continent, he had travelled down to Silvermines in Tipperary for another business meeting, and it was on the return journey that he lost control of his vehicle near Monasterevin,, County Kildare and died.

Speaking at the first session of the Dáil that followed, Taoiseach Jack Lynch offered a sincere and moving tribute to the late Deputy. He spoke of a TD who "commanded respect and attention", especially in matters of finance; a "gifted parliamentarian who loved the cut-and-thrust of debate" and who was as "fair an opponent as he was formidable". He noted a career cut short: "Through his tragic and untimely death, Dáil Éireann and Irish public life have suffered a grievous loss. That loss will be felt all the more because of his great impact on, and contribution to, Irish political life".

References

1908 births
1970 deaths
20th-century Irish lawyers
Fine Gael TDs
Fine Gael senators
Irish solicitors
Members of the 13th Dáil
Members of the 14th Dáil
Members of the 15th Dáil
Members of the 16th Dáil
Members of the 17th Dáil
Members of the 18th Dáil
Members of the 19th Dáil
Members of the 4th Seanad
Members of the 5th Seanad
Members of the Blueshirts
Ministers for Finance (Ireland)
Politicians from County Dublin
Politicians from County Kildare
Road incident deaths in the Republic of Ireland
Alumni of Trinity College Dublin
People educated at Downside School